{{DISPLAYTITLE:Adenosine A2A receptor}}

The adenosine A2A receptor, also known as ADORA2A, is an adenosine receptor, and also denotes the human gene encoding it.

Structure 
This protein is a member of the G protein-coupled receptor (GPCR) family which possess seven transmembrane alpha helices, as well as an extracellular N-terminus and an intracellular C-terminus. Furthermore, located in the intracellular side close to the membrane is a small alpha helix, often referred to as helix 8 (H8). The crystallographic structure of the adenosine A2A receptor reveals a ligand binding pocket distinct from that of other structurally determined GPCRs (i.e., the beta-2 adrenergic receptor and rhodopsin). Below this primary (orthosteric) binding pocket lies a secondary (allosteric) binding pocket. The crystal-structure of A2A bound to the antagonist ZM241385 (PDB code: 4EIY) showed that a sodium-ion can be found in this location of the protein, thus giving it the name 'sodium-ion binding pocket'.

Heteromers
The actions of the A2A receptor are complicated by the fact that a variety of functional heteromers composed of a mixture of A2A subunits with subunits from other unrelated G-protein coupled receptors have been found in the brain, adding a further degree of complexity to the role of adenosine in modulation of neuronal activity. Heteromers consisting of adenosine A1/A2A, dopamine D2/A2A and D3/A2A, glutamate mGluR5/A2A and cannabinoid CB1/A2A have all been observed, as well as CB1/A2A/D2 heterotrimers, and the functional significance and endogenous role of these hybrid receptors is still only starting to be unravelled.

The receptor's role in immunomodulation in the context of cancer has suggested that it is an important immune checkpoint molecule.

Function 

The gene encodes a protein which is one of several receptor subtypes for adenosine. The activity of the encoded protein, a G protein-coupled receptor family member, is mediated by G proteins which activate adenylyl cyclase, which induce synthesis of intracellular cAMP. The A2A receptor binds with the Gs protein at the intracellular site of the receptor. The Gs protein consists of three subunits; Gsα, Gsβ and Gsγ. A crystal structure of the A2A receptor bound with the agonist NECA and a G protein-mimic has been published in 2016 (PDB code: 5g53).

The encoded protein (the A2A receptor) is abundant in basal ganglia, vasculature, T lymphocytes, and platelets and it is a major target of caffeine, which is a competitive antagonist of this protein.

Physiological role 
A1 and A2A receptors are believed to regulate myocardial oxygen demand and to increase coronary circulation by vasodilation. In addition, A2A receptor can suppress immune cells, thereby protecting tissue from inflammation.

The A2A receptor is also expressed in the brain, where it has important roles in the regulation of glutamate and dopamine release, making it a potential therapeutic target for the treatment of conditions such as insomnia, pain, depression, and Parkinson's disease.

Ligands
A number of selective A2A ligands have been developed, with several possible therapeutic applications.

Older research on adenosine receptor function, and non-selective adenosine receptor antagonists such as aminophylline, focused mainly on the role of adenosine receptors in the heart, and led to several randomized controlled trials using these receptor antagonists to treat bradyasystolic arrest.

However the development of more highly selective A2A ligands has led towards other applications, with the most significant focus of research currently being the potential therapeutic role for A2A antagonists in the treatment of Parkinson's disease.

Agonists 

 ATL-146e
 YT-146/2-octynyladenosine
 CGS-21680
 DPMA (N6-(2-(3,5-dimethoxyphenyl)-2-(2-methylphenyl)ethyl)adenosine)
 Regadenoson
 UK-432,097
 Limonene 
 Zeatin riboside 
 NECA (5′-(N-Ethylcarboxamido)adenosine)
 binodenoson
 Cannabidiol

Antagonists

ATL-444
 Istradefylline (KW-6002)
 MSX-3
 Preladenant (SCH-420,814)
 SCH-58261
 SCH-412,348
 SCH-442,416
 ST-1535
 Caffeine
 VER-6623
 VER-6947
 VER-7835
 Vipadenant (BIIB-014)
 ZM-241,385

Interactions 
Adenosine A2A receptor has been shown to interact with Dopamine receptor D2. As a result, Adenosine receptor A2A decreases activity in the Dopamine D2 receptors.

In cancer immunotherapy 
The adenosine A2A receptor has also been shown to play a regulatory role in the adaptive immune system. In this role, it functions similarly to programmed cell death-1 (PD-1) and cytotoxic t-lymphocyte associated protein-4 (CTLA-4) receptors, namely to suppress immunologic response and prevent associated tissue damage. Extracellular adenosine gathers in response to cellular stress and breakdown through interactions with hypoxia induced HIF-1α. Abundant extracellular adenosine can then bind to the A2A receptor resulting in a Gs-protein coupled response, resulting in the accumulation of intracellular cAMP, which functions primarily through protein kinase A to upregulate inhibitory cytokines such as transforming growth factor-beta (TGF-β) and inhibitory receptors (i.e., PD-1). Interactions with FOXP3 stimulates CD4+ T-cells into regulatory Treg cells further inhibiting immune response.

Blockade of A2AR has been attempted to various ends, namely cancer immunotherapy. While several A2A receptor antagonists have progressed to clinical trials for the treatment of Parkinson's disease, A2AR blockade in the context of cancer is less characterized. Mice treated with A2AR antagonists, such as ZM241385 (listed above) or caffeine, show significantly delayed tumor growth due to T-cells resistant to inhibition. This is further highlighted by A2AR knockout mice who show increased tumor rejection. Multiple checkpoint pathway inhibition has been shown to have an additive effect, as shown by an increase in response with blockade to PD-1 and CTLA-4 via monoclonal antibodies as compared to the blockade of a single pathway. Researchers believe that A2AR blockade could increase the efficacy of such treatments even further. Finally, inhibition of A2AR, either through pharmacologic or genetic targeting, in chimeric antigen receptor (CAR) T-cells reveals promising results. Blockade of A2AR in this setting has shown to increase tumor clearance through CAR T-cell therapy in mice. Targeting of the A2A receptor is an attractive option for the treatment of a variety of cancers, especially with the therapeutic success of the blockade of other checkpoint pathways such as PD-1 and CTLA-4.

References

Further reading

External links 
 

Adenosine receptors